Assassin's Creed Mirage is an upcoming action-adventure game developed by Ubisoft Bordeaux and published by Ubisoft. It will be the thirteenth major installment in the Assassin's Creed series and the successor to 2020's Assassin's Creed Valhalla. Principally set in 9th-century Baghdad during the Islamic Golden Age, the game will follow Basim Ibn Ishaq (a character first introduced in Valhalla) and his transition from street thief to fully-fledged member of the Assassin Brotherhood, who fight for peace and liberty, against the Templar Order, who desire peace through control. The game has been described as a return to the series' roots, with a bigger focus on linear storytelling and stealth gameplay than more recent installments, which primarily focused on role-playing and open world elements. 

Mirage is set to be released for PlayStation 4, PlayStation 5, Windows, Xbox One, Xbox Series X and Series S, and Amazon Luna in 2023.

Gameplay
Mirage is an action-adventure stealth game intended to be reminiscent of older Assassin's Creed titles, being more linear and story-focused and reducing the number of role-playing elements present in recent installments of the series. The game is set principally in Baghdad, which is divided into four districts, but also features Alamut, the fortress headquarters of the Hidden Ones. Parkour, close-quarter combat, and stealth are core elements of the gameplay. Mirage also marks the return of the "Black Box" assassination missions from Assassin's Creed Unity and Assassin's Creed Syndicate, in which players have to explore the environment to find different ways to reach and eliminate their targets. As a Hidden One, Basim will have a large arsenal of weapons and tools at his disposal, including the signature Assassin Hidden Blade and smoke bombs.

Synopsis
Set decades before the events of Assassin's Creed Valhalla, Mirage is a "coming-of-age story" following Basim Ibn Ishaq (Lee Majdoub), a street thief who will learn to fight for a cause larger than himself by becoming a Hidden One under the tutelage of his mentor Roshan (Shohreh Aghdashloo).

Development
Mirage has been described as a smaller Assassin's Creed title, and that the game's length would last around 15–20 hours, similar to older games in the franchise. It is being designed to celebrate the series' 15th anniversary, in which the team is going to use the technology built for Valhalla to create a game that pays tribute to the first Assassin's Creed.

Prior to its announcement at Ubisoft Forward on September 10, 2022, details about Mirage leaked–under the codename Rift–when it was revealed that the game started out as an expansion pack for Valhalla before being turned into a standalone release.

Release
Mirage is set to be released in 2023 for PlayStation 4, PlayStation 5, Windows, Xbox One, Xbox Series X/S, and Amazon Luna. Shortly after the game's announcement, the title was reported as receiving an Adults Only rating from the Entertainment Software Rating Board, which would have limited the number of outlets it could be distributed at in the United States, following a listing on the Xbox Store a week prior to the game's reveal, with one of the reasons being for containing "real gambling". Ubisoft swiftly corrected both claims, stating the game had not been rated yet and "no real gambling or lootboxes [will be] present in the game".

Notes

References

External links
 

Upcoming video games scheduled for 2023
Action-adventure games
Assassin's Creed
Open-world video games
PlayStation 4 games
PlayStation 4 Pro enhanced games
PlayStation 5 games
Single-player video games
Stealth video games
Ubisoft games
Video games developed in Canada
Video games developed in France
Video games scored by Jesper Kyd
Video games scored by Sarah Schachner
Video games set in Iraq
Windows games
Xbox One X enhanced games
Xbox One games
Xbox Series X and Series S games